Mordellistena paramoresbyensis is a species of beetle in the genus Mordellistena of the family Mordellidae. It was described by Batten in 1990.

References

Beetles described in 1990
paramoresbyensis